Everything Goes Wrong is the second studio album by American indie rock band Vivian Girls. It was released on September 8, 2009 by In the Red Records.

In 2019, Everything Goes Wrong was reissued by Polyvinyl Record Co., alongside Vivian Girls' 2008 self-titled debut album.

Critical reception

Everything Goes Wrong was listed as the 54th best album of 2009 by Rough Trade. Artrocker ranked it as the year's 61st best album.

Track listing

Personnel
Credits are adapted from the album's liner notes.

Vivian Girls
 Katy "Kickball Katy" Goodman
 Ali Koehler
 Cassie Ramone

Additional personnel
 Mike McHugh – mixing, recording

Charts

References

External links
 

2009 albums
Vivian Girls albums
In the Red Records albums